My Life: An Attempt at an Autobiography (Russian: Моя Жизнь) is the name of the Russian revolutionary Communist leader Leon Trotsky's autobiography. The book was first published in 1930 and was written in the first year of Trotsky's exile in Turkey. It covers the time from his youth, through the Revolution of 1905, the Revolution of 1917, the Russian Civil War up to his struggle against Stalinism and eventual expulsion from the Communist Party.  

The Russian/Soviet historian Dmitri Volkogonov claims that Trotsky's "My Life, must hold pride of place as a work of remarkable self-analysis, as well as imaginative history. Although he wrote it at the relatively early age of forty-eight, soon after his deportation, his life up to then had been eventful enough to merit recording." 

Before he settled with the simple title My Life, Trotsky tried out several titles: 

Half A Century (1879 - 1929)
An Experiment in Autobiography
Flood Tides and Ebb Tides: The Autobiography of a Revolutionary
In the Service of the Revolution: An Experiment in Autobiography
A Life of Struggle: The Autobiography of a Revolutionary
To Live is to Struggle: The Autobiography of a Revolutionary

See also

 List of books by Leon Trotsky

Footnotes

External links
 My Life the whole book at the Marxists Internet Archive.

1930 non-fiction books
Communist books
Political autobiographies
Works by Leon Trotsky
Books about Trotskyism